Big Snake may refer to:

People
 Robin Big Snake (born 1984), Canadian former professional hockey player
 Omoxesisixany, a chief of the Blackfoot Native American tribe
 Big Snake (Ponca chief), a chief of the Ponca Native American tribe, and brother of the chief Standing Bear

Other:
 Snake Creek (Susquehanna River), Pennsylvania, sometimes called Big Snake Creek

See also
 Grootslang (Dutch for "big snake"), a legendary cryptid alleged to live in South Africa